Albert John Gibson (April 1, 1862 – December 31, 1927) was one of the most prominent and well-known architects in Missoula, Montana who designed a number of buildings that are listed on the National Register of Historic Places.

History
Gibson was born on a farm near Savannah, Ashland County, Ohio in 1862 and arrived in Butte, Montana. After learning the craft of architecture and carpentry, Gibson moved to Missoula, Montana, around 1889. He married Maud Lockley on January 30, 1889. Maud was the daughter of a well-known newspaperman, Fredrick Lockley. A.J. Gibson had a short career as a carpenter before designing many landmark buildings in the Missoula and Bitterroot area. Gibson retired in 1909, but as a devout Presbyterian and friend of Rev. John Maclean (father of well known author, Norman Maclean), he drew up the architectural plans for the First Presbyterian Church, which opened in 1915. He and his wife were killed instantly on December 31, 1927, when their automobile was struck by a train in Missoula.

Notable Works
Atlantic Hotel, 519 N. Higgins Ave., Missoula, Montana, NRHP-listed
Bass Mansion (1908–09), 216 N. College St., Stevensville, Montana (with supervising architect John Brechbill)) NRHP-listed
Carnegie Public Library, 335 N. Pattee St., Missoula, Montana, NRHP-listed
A. J. Gibson House, 402 S. 2nd St., Missoula, Montana, NRHP-listed
Hamilton Town Hall, 175 S. 3rd St., Hamilton, Montana, NRHP-listed
Knowles Building, 200—210 S. Third St. W, Missoula, Montana, NRHP-listed
Lucy Building, 330 N. Higgins Ave., Missoula, Montana, NRHP-listed
George May House, 100 Park Ave., Stevensville, Montana, NRHP-listed
Missoula County Courthouse, 220 W. Broadway, Missoula, Montana, NRHP-listed
Ravalli County Courthouse, 225 Bedford St., Hamilton, Montana, NRHP-listed
Riverside, Eastside Hwy., Hamilton, Montana, NRHP-listed
Fred T. Sterling House, 1310 Gerald Ave., Missoula, Montana, NRHP-listed
University Apartments, 400-422 Roosevelt Ave., Missoula, Montana, NRHP-listed
One or more works in East Pine Street Historic District, Roughly bounded by E. Pine St., Madison St., E. Broadway, and Pattee St., Missoula, Montana, NRHP-listed
One or more works in Hamilton Commercial Historic District, Main, N. Second, S. Second, S. Third, and State Sts., Hamilton, Montana, NRHP-listed
One or more works in Missoula Southside Historic District, roughly bounded by the Clark Fork R., S. Higgins Ave., S. 6th St. W. and Orange St., Missoula, Montana, NRHP-listed
One or more works in University of Montana Historic District, roughly bounded by Arthur, Connell and Beckwith Aves. and the ridge lines of Mt. Sentinel, Missoula, Montana, NRHP-listed
Somers Mansion in Somers, Montana, a 14 bedroom, 3 bathroom Mansion built for Lumber Company owner John O'Brien.
Main Hall (University Hall), University of Montana 
Daly Mansion remodel, 251 Eastside Hwy, Hamilton, MT 59840

References

External links
 A.J. Gibson and Maude Lockley Gibson Estate Collection, 1864-1957 (University of Montana Archives)
 A.J. Gibson Collection (University of Montana Archives)
 Gibson, Kirkemo, and Bakke Architectural Drawings, 1890-1971 (University of Montana)

1862 births
1927 deaths
Architects from Montana
Architects from Ohio
People from Ashland County, Ohio
Artists from Missoula, Montana
Railway accident deaths in the United States
Road incident deaths in Montana